Jean Boyer (26 June 1901 – 10 March 1965) was a French film director and songwriter.  He was born in Paris.

Selected songs
 1930: "Un regardé", in Flagrant délit (Hanns Schwarz, 1930, music by F. Hollaender)
 1931: "Les Gars de la marine", in Le Capitaine Craddock (music by W. R. Heyman)
 1932: "Totor t'as tort" (music by René Mercier) - "Un homme" - "L'amour est un mystère" - "Maintenant, je sais ce que c'est" - "Quand ça m'prend" (music by Michel Levine)
 1934: "C’est peu de chose" (music by R. Ervan)
 1936: "Y'a toujours un passage à niveau" (music by Georges Van Parys)
 1939: "Comme de bien entendu" - "Ça c'est passé un dimanche" - "Mimile" - "Ça fait d'excellents Français" (music by Georges Van Parys)
 1945: "Pour me rendre à mon bureau" (words and music)
 1950: "La Pagaïa" and "Je cherche un cœur" (music by Henri Betti)

Filmography

Director

 Calais-Dover (1931)
 La Pouponnière (1932)
 Monsieur, Madame and Bibi (1932)
 L'Amour guide (1933)
 Antonia (1935)
  Roses noires (1935)
  Les Époux célibataires (1935)
 Counsel for Romance (1936)
 Prends la route (1936)
  Mon curé chez les riches (1938)
 Mother Love (1938)
  Ma sœur de lait (1939)
  Cocoanut (1939)
  Extenuating Circumstances (1939)
 Serenade (1940)
  Miquette (1940)
 The Acrobat (1941)
 Romance of Paris (1941)
 Chèque au porteur (1941)
 Bolero (1942)
 Prince Charming (1942)
 At Your Command, Madame (1942)
 Frederica (1942)
  La Bonne Étoile (1943)
  La Femme fatale (1945)
 That's Not the Way to Die (1946)
 Les Aventures de Casanova (1946)
  Mademoiselle Has Fun (1947)
  Une femme par jour (1948)
 Brilliant Waltz (1949)
  All Roads Lead to Rome (1949)
 The Prize (1950)
We Will All Go to Paris (1950)
 Le Passe-muraille (1951)
 Monte Carlo Baby (1952)
 Crazy for Love (1952)
  An Artist with Ladies (1952)
 A Hundred Francs a Second (1953)
 Women of Paris (1953)
  Une vie de garçon (1953)
  The Country of the Campanelli (1954)
  I Had Seven Daughters (1955)
 Madelon (1955)
 Le Couturier de ces dames (1956)
 The Terror with Women (1956)
  Sénéchal le magnifique (1957)
 Mademoiselle and Her Gang (1957)
 Le Chômeur de Clochemerle (1957)
 The Lord's Vineyard (1958)
 Nina (1959)
 The Indestructible (1959)
  Le Confident de ces dames (1959)
  Bouche cousue (1960)
 Les Croulants se portent bien (1961)
 Virginie (1962)
 It's Not My Business (1962)
 The Bamboo Stroke (1963)
 Relax Darling (1964)

Scriptwriter
 End of the World (1931)
 Princess, At Your Orders! (1931)
 Caught in the Act (1931)
 The Typist (1931)
 Kiss Me (1932)
 Honeymoon Trip (1933)

External links
 
 Jean Boyer on data.bnf.fr

1901 births
1965 deaths
Film directors from Paris
20th-century French screenwriters
French songwriters
Male songwriters
Chevaliers of the Légion d'honneur
Burials at Batignolles Cemetery